Le Cordon Bleu  (French for "The Blue Ribbon") is an international network of hospitality and culinary schools teaching French haute cuisine. Its educational focuses are hospitality management, culinary arts, and gastronomy. The institution consists of 35 institutes in 20 countries and has over 20,000 students of many different nationalities.

History 

The origin of the school name derives, indirectly, from the French Royal and Catholic Order of the Holy Spirit. This was a select group of the French Nobility that had been knighted. The first creation of Royal Knights at the French Court was performed in 1578. The French Order of the Holy Spirit was for many centuries the highest distinction of the French Kingdom. Each member was awarded the Cross of the Holy Spirit, which hung from a blue silk ribbon.  According to one story, this group became known for its extravagant and luxurious banquets, known as "cordons bleus". 
At the time of the French Revolution, the monarchy and the Order were abolished, but the name remained synonymous with excellent French cooking. By the nineteenth century the blue ribbon had become synonymous with excellence. The name was adopted by a French culinary magazine, La Cuisinière Cordon Bleu, founded by Marthe Distel in the late 19th century. The magazine began offering lessons by some of the best chefs in France.

The magazine developed into the original Le Cordon Bleu that Distel and Henri-Paul Pellaprat established in 1895 in Paris, France. In 1945, after the end of WWII, Madame Elisabeth Brassart purchased what remained of the struggling school from a Catholic orphanage which had inherited it after Distel died in the late 1930s. Brassart managed the school until 1984; at the age of 87 she retired and sold the school to André J. Cointreau, a direct descendant of the founding family of the Cointreau liqueur and Rémy Martin Cognac.

Other countries
In 1933, former student Dione Lucas helped to open a school under the Le Cordon Bleu name in London, England.

In the United States, 16 schools used to operate under the "Le Cordon Bleu North America" name through a licensing agreement with Career Education Corporation (CEC), a for-profit education company based in Chicago, Illinois. In 2009, the license was estimated to be worth $135 million. In 2014, Le Cordon Bleu North America generated $178.6 million in revenue and $70.6 million of operating losses. However, in light of the gainful employment rules implemented by the US Department of Education in 2015, CEC made the decision to sell the 16 campuses. When CEC failed to find a buyer it announced on 16 December 2015 that all 16 campuses in the United States would close by September 2017, giving enrolled students time to finish their programs.
The last new students were accepted in January 2016. In June 2016, the Securities and Exchange Commission requested documents and information regarding Career Education's fourth quarter 2014 classification of its Le Cordon Bleu campuses.

Le Cordon Bleu has continued to maintain a presence in the United States through its New York office, Le Cordon Bleu Inc., which places students in the locations abroad.

Cities with schools
Campuses in Europe
Paris, France
London, England
Madrid, Spain
Istanbul, Turkey

Campuses in the Americas 
Brazil
Rio de Janeiro 
São Paulo
Ottawa, Ontario, Canada
Mexico City, Mexico
Lima, Peru

Campuses in Oceania 
Australia
Adelaide
Brisbane 
Melbourne
Sydney
Wellington, New Zealand

Campuses in Asia
Shanghai, China
Beirut, Lebanon
Gurgaon, India
Tokyo, Japan
Seoul, Korea
Kuala Lumpur, Malaysia
Kaohsiung, Taiwan
Bangkok, Thailand
Manila, Philippines

In books and films 
Le Cordon Bleu played in central role in the 2009 American film Julie & Julia, which was partly based on Julia Child's  memoir My Life in France. In addition, central protagonists in other films attended or were graduates of Le Cordon Bleu such as Audrey Hepburn's character in the 1954 American film Sabrina, Huo Ting En in the 2017 Taiwanese television series The Perfect Match, Dev D in the 2017 Bengali film Maacher Jhol and Hervé Villechaize's character Nick Nack in the 1974 James Bond film The Man with the Golden Gun.

The school also plays a central role in publications by its students. For example, American writer Kathleen Flinn's 2007 book The Sharper Your Knife, the Less You Cry, is the first insider's account of attending the modern Paris flagship school. Flinn's best-selling memoir recounts the day-to-day trials of the contemporary program and provides a further history of the school. The book was translated into several languages.

Alumni

 Alumni of the Paris location include Julia Child, Csaba dalla Zorza, Giada De Laurentiis, Dame Mary Berry, Gastón Acurio, Renatta Moeloek and Jesselyn Lauwreen.
 Alumni of the Los Angeles location include David Burtka and Sicily Sewell.

See also
 
 French cuisine

References

External links

French cuisine
Cooking schools
 
Career Education Corporation
For-profit universities and colleges
Educational institutions established in the 1570s
1578 establishments in France
Cooking schools in France
15th arrondissement of Paris
For-profit universities and colleges in Europe
Cooking schools in the United Kingdom